Grigor Dimitrov and Teymuraz Gabashvili were the defending champions, but decided not to participate.
Karol Beck and Lukáš Rosol won in the final 4–6, 7–6(3), [10–8], against Alexander Peya and Martin Slanar.

Seeds

Draw

Draw

References
 Doubles Draw

ATP Challenger Trophy - Doubles
2010 Doubles